Sergei Alekseyevich Abramov (born 9 September 1990), is a Russian futsal player who plays for Sinara and the Russian national futsal team.

Achievements 

 Russian Futsal Championship Winner (3): 2008/09, 2009/10, 2020/21

Personal 
 The best player of the Russian championship: 2021
 The best forward of the Russian championship: 2021

References

External links 
 Dina profile
 UEFA profile
 AMFR profile 

1990 births
Living people
Futsal forwards
Russian men's futsal players